Sir Walter Tailboys (1350–1417) was an English landowner, soldier, administrator and politician who made his home in Lincolnshire.

References

1350 births
1417 deaths
14th-century English landowners
15th-century English landowners
Politicians from Lincolnshire
English knights